AB Aani CD is a 2020 Marathi-language comedy film directed by Milind Lele, produced by Abhayananad Singh, Akshay Bardapurkar, Arvind Reddy, Krishna Persaud and Piyush Singh under banner of Planet Marathi Production, Golden Ratio Films and KCR Reddy Production. The film starring Vikram Gokhale, Subodh Bhave, Sayali Sanjeev  and Akshay Tanksale The film also has cameo by Amitabh Bachchan as himself.

The principal photography began on 20 May 2019 and wrapped up on 7 August 2019. The film was released on 13 March 2020 and also on Amazon Prime Video on 1 May 2020.

Plot

Cast 
 Vikram Gokhale as Chandrakant Deshpande (CD)
 Amitabh Bachchan as Himself (AB)
 Akshay Tanksale as Sunny Deshpande (CD's grandson) 
 Sayali Sanjeev as Gargi (Sunny's Pune-based girlfriend) 
 Subodh Bhave as owner of Planet Marathi (Gargi's employer) 
 Sakshi Satish as Shravni Deshpande (CD's granddaughter) 
 Lokesh Gupte as Govind Deshpande (CD's older son)
 Sharvari Lokohare as Radha Deshpande (CD's older daughter-in-law)
 Sagar Talashikar as Gopal Deshpande (CD's younger son)
 Seema Deshmukh as CD's younger daughter-in-law
 Jayant Sawarkar as Shivalkar (CD's friend) 
 Sunil Godbole as Sawant (CD's friend) 
 Milind Shintre as Tailor (Special Appearance) 
 Prashant Tapasvi as Canteen Owner (Special Appearance) 
 Devaki Pandit as Herself (Cameo Appearance)

Production

Filming
Principal photography began on 20 May 2019 at Mumbai. Filming also took place at Pune. Principal photography wrapped on 7 August 2019.

This Marathi Feature Film is produced by Abhayanand Singh & Piyush Singh from Golden Ratio Films, Arvind Reddy & Krishna Persaud from KV Reddy Productions and Akshay Bardapurkar from Planet Marathi

Release
The film was released on 13 March 2020 but was pulled out of theaters because of COVID-19 pandemic lockdown in India. Later the film was released on Amazon prime on 1 May 2020.

Soundtrack

Soundtrack of the film was composed by Mayuresh Pai and Ashish Mujumdar whereas lyrics were penned by Vaibhav Joshi. The music was arranged by Anand Sahastrabuddhe.

References

External links

2020 comedy films
2020 films
2020s Marathi-language films
Indian comedy films
Cultural depictions of Amitabh Bachchan